Lake Vorozheska (Ukrainian: озеро Ворожеська) is the lake in the Carpathian Mountains of Ukraine. It is a hydrological natural monument of local significance.

Lake Vorozheska is located on the northern slopes of the Svydovets massif at an elevation of 1460 meters above sea level. It has glacial origin and is situated in a cirque. The lake consists of two connected bodies of water, a bigger and a smaller one. The water of the lake is clear and cool. Thickets of juniper and blueberry grow around it.

References 

Lakes of Ukraine
Protected areas of Ukraine
Tourist attractions in Zakarpattia Oblast